Falak is a 1988 Indian Hindi-language action crime film drama directed by Shashilal K. Nair, produced by V. Sagar Bhagat and written by Salim Khan. The music for the film is composed by Kalyanji-Anandji. It stars Raakhee, Jackie Shroff, Madhavi, Shekhar Kapoor, Mohan Bhandari, Supriya Pathak, Sadhana Singh, Anupam Kher, Paresh Rawal, Kiran Kumar, Vikram Gokhale in pivotal roles.

Plot 
A watchman(Ramnath) is killed by their corrupt bosses when the former tries to stop their criminal activities. Years later, Ramnath's sons decides to avenge their father's death.

Cast

 Raakhee as Durga Verma
 Jackie Shroff as Vijay Verma
 Madhavi as Rita D'Souza
 Mohan Bhandari as Advocate Ravi Verma
 Shekhar Kapoor as Inspector Jimmy
 Supriya Pathak as Shobha
 Sadhana Singh as Shanti
 Akash Khurana as Jamnadas
 Anupam Kher as Murlidhar
 Paresh Rawal as R.D. Narang
 Kiran Kumar as Bagga
 Iftekhar as Mr. D'Souza
 Vikram Gokhale as Ramnath Verma
 Ketaki Dave as Julie
 Anang Desai as Doctor
 Murad as Judge
 Vikas Anand as Judge
 Mohan Choti as Mukadam
 Rajan Haksar as Public Prosecutor
 Sharad Vyas as Motwani

Soundtrack

References

External links 

Films shot in India
Indian crime action films
1988 films
1980s Hindi-language films
1980s crime action films